New Ocean Media is a Birmingham, Alabama-based public relations firm.  It is a privately held corporation with offices in Birmingham, Alabama.  It also operates a record label and an artist management firm.

New Ocean Media has divisions devoted to national PR, tour press, TV and film song placement, music video servicing, radio promotion, artist development, and social media.

History 
New Ocean Media was founded in 2005 and is a leading US music and entertainment public relations firm. It works with clients in various sectors of the entertainment industry including record labels, bands, artists, music supervisors, music management firms, radio stations, television and film companies, and music producers.

Notable clients 
Warner Music Group
Capitol Records
EMI
Universal Records
Dualtone Records
Glassnote Records
Sony Music
Island/Def Jam
Motörhead
Clutch
Buckcherry
Nothing More
Dream Theater
Saxon 
Red
Asking Alexandria
Adelitas Way
Brian "Head" Welch
A Day to Remember
Jive Records
Britney Spears
Framing Hanley
Adler
Hinder
Candlebox
Tantric
Union Entertainment Group (UEG)
Silent Majority Group
secondhand serenade
Lynam
In Flames
Cinderella
Sebastian Bach
Kevin Costner

References

American independent record labels
Public relations companies of the United States
Record labels established in 2005